Hypargyria slossonella is a species of snout moth in the genus Hypargyria. It was described by George Duryea Hulst in 1900, and is known from Florida and Mexico.

There are several generations per year.

The larvae feed on Hippocratea volubilis. Young larvae feed on the upper or lower epidermis and mesophyll of the leaves of their host plant. During development they form small, loose protective structures on the host plant from silk, frass, and surrounding leaves. Later instars silk together larger clusters of whole, partially eaten, and dead leaves. Several larvae may inhabit a single enclosure. Pupation occurs in the soil.

References

Moths described in 1900
Phycitini